Stephen Hay may refer to:

 Stephen J. Hay (1864–1916), mayor of Dallas, Texas
Ste Hay, fictional character

See also
Stephen Hayes (disambiguation)
Steven Hayes (disambiguation)